Tobias Martin Ellwood  (born 12 August 1966) is a British Conservative Party politician and soldier who has been the Member of Parliament (MP) for Bournemouth East since 2005. He has chaired the Defence Select Committee since 2020 and was a Government Minister at the Ministry of Defence from 2017 to 2019. Prior to his political career, Ellwood served in the Royal Green Jackets and reached the rank of captain. He transferred to the Army Reserve and has gone on to reach the rank of lieutenant colonel in the 77th Brigade.

Early life

Born in New York City to British parents, Ellwood was educated at schools in Bonn and Vienna, where he attended the Vienna International School. He attended Loughborough University from 1985 to 1990, and became a sabbatical officer at Loughborough Students' Union. He graduated with a bachelor's degree and later attended the Cass Business School at City University from 1997 to 1998 where he received a Master of Business Administration degree (MBA).

While a member of the University Officers' Training Corps (UOTC), Ellwood was commissioned as a second lieutenant in the Territorial Army in 1989. After completing the Regular Army commissioning course at Sandhurst he joined the Royal Green Jackets in 1991, and transferred from the active list to the Reserve of Officers in 1996 having reached the rank of captain.

After leaving the Regular Army he became a researcher to the Conservative MP Tom King. He was elected chairman of the Hertfordshire South West Conservative Association for a year in 1998.

Parliamentary career
Ellwood was elected as a councillor on Dacorum Borough Council in Hertfordshire in 1999, and contested the parliamentary seat of Worsley in Manchester at the 2001 general election being defeated by the sitting Labour MP Terry Lewis by 11,787 votes. He was selected to contest the safe Conservative seat of Bournemouth East to succeed David Atkinson. He was elected at the 2005 general election with a majority of 5,244 votes and remains the MP for Bournemouth East. He made his maiden speech in the House of Commons on 19 May 2005.

A supporter of David Cameron's campaign for the leadership of the Conservative Party, Ellwood was appointed to the Opposition Whips Office in December 2005. In the July 2007 reshuffle, Cameron promoted Ellwood to his frontbench team as Shadow Minister for Culture, Media and Sport, with specific responsibilities for gambling, licensing and tourism. He was criticised in the press after reportedly describing Liverpudlian landlords taking over pubs in his constituency as "criminals" in 2009; Ellwood said the comments had been taken out of context.

Following the 2010 general election, he was appointed Parliamentary Private Secretary (PPS) to then Defence Secretary, Liam Fox, and in October 2011 was appointed PPS to David Lidington, Minister for Europe at the Foreign and Commonwealth Office. In October 2013, Ellwood was appointed PPS to Health Secretary, Jeremy Hunt. On 15 July 2014, Ellwood was appointed as Parliamentary Under-Secretary of State for the Middle East, Africa and FCO Services.

Ellwood has also been appointed a Member of the Parliamentary Delegation to the NATO Assembly, 2014 and Parliamentary Advisor to the Prime Minister for the 2014 NATO Summit. He is a proponent of "double summer time".

In 2011, Ellwood served on the Special Select Committee set up to scrutinise the Bill which became the Armed Forces Act 2011. He was also a member of the Public Bill Committee for the Defence Reform Act 2014.

In May 2014 he was one of seven unsuccessful candidates for the chairmanship of the House of Commons Defence Select Committee.

In 2015, he backed the move by IPSA to increase salaries for politicians by 10% when the rest of the public sector were on a freeze of 1%. He apologised for any offence caused by the comment that without the proposed raise to his £90,000 salary he would be "watching the pennies" but also reminded people that he had taken a salary cut when becoming an MP.

In September 2015, the Independent Parliamentary Standards Authority named Ellwood and 25 current and former MPs who failed to settle a total of approximately £2,000 the previous year in overclaimed expenses, forcing them to be written off. The debts ranged from £309 to £7.50. The expenses claim that Ellwood had submitted of £26.50 was subsequently settled.

Ellwood voted to remain in the 2016 EU referendum. He later stated that the leave result should nevertheless be respected and that the government should not try to reverse this decision.

On 22 March 2017, during a terrorist attack on Parliament, Ellwood gave mouth-to-mouth resuscitation and CPR to police officer Keith Palmer, who later died of his injuries. Ellwood was called a "hero" by those at Westminster and the press, as photos surfaced of him with blood on his face while he crouched over the body of the dying police officer. Consequently, Ellwood received a lot of praise on social media for his actions, as well as being promised an appointment to the Privy Council for his response in the attack. Ellwood's appointment to the Privy Council was formally approved on 12 April 2017.

In November 2018, George Papadopoulos accused Ellwood of being a British source that was allegedly spying on Donald Trump and others, a claim which he publicly denied.

In 2018, Ellwood was placed at 100/1 to be the next Conservative Party leader. He did not stand in the 2019 leadership election, but instead endorsed Matt Hancock, then subsequently Rory Stewart. He stopped being a minister when Boris Johnson won in July 2019.

In December 2020, during the COVID-19 pandemic, Ellwood urged the government not to relax the rules governing social mixing over the Christmas period, then attended a Christmas party at the Cavalry and Guards Club in London with 26 other people. He was criticised for his decision to attend by Home Secretary Priti Patel, who said, "Having dinner... outside of the rules with a large number of people is a breach of the regulations."

In June 2022, he sent a letter of no confidence in the Conservative Party leadership of Boris Johnson to the 1922 Committee. In early July 2022, he told the Bournemouth Daily Echo that he was not interested in standing in the upcoming leadership election.

On 19 July 2022 Ellwood lost the Conservative whip for failing to support the government in a vote of confidence the day before. He was in Moldova to meet the President, Maia Sandu, and was unable to travel back. He was initially not eligible to vote in the remaining MP rounds of the Conservative Party leadership election but, as a Conservative Party member, could vote in the final round. He was granted a "momentary return of the whip" so he could vote in the final MP round. He voted for Penny Mordaunt. In the closing stages of the Tory leadership contest, reports emerged that moderate Tories feared a Liz Truss government.  On 4 September 2022 (the night before Truss was confirmed as Conservative Party Leader), Ellwood published an article on Politics Home appealing to colleagues to move closer to the political centre ground. On 14 October 2022, Ellwood had the Conservative whip restored.

In the October 2022 Conservative Party leadership election, Elwood supported Rishi Sunak.

Ongoing military career
In September 2018, Ellwood announced that he had been promoted to the rank of lieutenant colonel as a reservist in the 77th Brigade, based at Denison Barracks, Hermitage, Berkshire, a psychological operations unit responsible for 'non-lethal' warfare which disseminates government-friendly podcasts and videos.

Personal life
In July 2005, Ellwood married Hannah Ryan, a corporate lawyer, in East Yorkshire. They have two sons. Ellwood has a sister, Charlotte Ellwood-Aris. His brother, Jonathan, who was director of studies at the International School Ho Chi Minh City in Vietnam, was killed in the 2002 Bali bombing.

In June 2009, Ellwood was attacked by a gang of youths after confronting them for playing football in the street. The gang threw stones at him and Ellwood was punched in the head. A 17-year-old male was arrested over the attack. The arrestee was later given a two-year community order. Ellwood expressed relief that the youth was not sent to jail.

Honours

 He was sworn in as a member of the Privy Council on 24 March 2017. This gave him the honorific prefix "The Right Honourable".

Publications
Ellwood has written the following recent publications:
 Post Conflict Reconstruction – Bridging the gap between Military and Civilian Affairs on the Modern Battlefield (November 2009)
 Time to Change the Clocks – Arguing the case for moving our clocks forward (November 2010)-
 Upgrading UK influence in the European Union – A strategy to improve upstream scrutiny of EU legislation (November 2012)
 Stabilizing Afghanistan: Proposals for Improving Security, Governance, and Aid/Economic Development – Atlantic Council (April 2013)
 Leveraging UK Carrier Capability (September 2013)
 Improving Efficiency, Interoperability and Resilience of our Blue Light Services (December 2013)

Notes

References

External links
 Official website
 
 Debrett's People of Today
 Guardian Unlimited Politics – Ask Aristotle: Tobias Ellwood MP
 Bournemouth East Conservatives

News items
 Calling for the licensing of opium in October 2006
 Binge drinking in Bournemouth in February 2006
 David Cameron's election plans stolen by a car thief in November 2005
 BBC article on Bali bombing

1966 births
Living people
20th-century British Army personnel
Alumni of Bayes Business School
Alumni of City, University of London
Alumni of Loughborough University
American emigrants to England
Conservative Party (UK) MPs for English constituencies
Councillors in Hertfordshire
Government ministers of the United Kingdom
Independent members of the House of Commons of the United Kingdom
Members of the Privy Council of the United Kingdom
Military personnel from Bournemouth
Politics of Dorset
Royal Green Jackets officers
UK MPs 2005–2010
UK MPs 2010–2015
UK MPs 2015–2017
UK MPs 2017–2019
UK MPs 2019–present
Writers from Bournemouth
Politicians from Bournemouth
Politicians affected by a party expulsion process